Jake Sequoyah Shields (born January 9, 1979) is an American mixed martial artist and submission grappler. He was the last Rumble on the Rock Welterweight Champion, the only Elite XC Welterweight Champion, a former Shooto Welterweight Champion and former Strikeforce Middleweight Champion. He also fought in the Ultimate Fighting Championship (UFC) challenging Georges St. Pierre for the UFC Welterweight Championship.

He has trained extensively with Fairtex SF and Cesar Gracie and is a member of the "Skrap Pack," which includes fellow Cesar Gracie students Dave Terrell, Nick Diaz, Nate Diaz, and Gilbert Melendez. After his loss to Akira Kikuchi he won 15 consecutive fights over six years, until his loss to UFC Welterweight Champion Georges St-Pierre. He describes his style as American Jiu-jitsu.

Early life
Shields was raised near Mountain Ranch, California, in the Sierra Nevada. He was home schooled up to junior high. He and his two older brothers grew up at the end of a dirt road on the rim of the Jesus Maria Canyon. Their nearest friends were a 45-minute hike down one side of the canyon and up the other. Their activities included mountain biking, wild caving, snowboarding, clearing brush, bucking firewood, climbing mountains, exploring the high country, and wrestling.

Shields began amateur wrestling at age nine. He has competed in over 601 folkstyle, freestyle, and submission wrestling matches. Shields was a four-year varsity wrestler and state qualifier at Calaveras High School, finished 2nd place at the Amateur Athletic Union National Freestyle Championships, qualified for U.S. / FILA Nationals & World Team Trials in both the junior & university men's divisions. He is also a two-time junior college All-American wrestler from Cuesta College, placing 4th in the California JC state tournament in the  weight class in 1997 and 3rd in the  weight class a year later. In September 1999, Shields began his MMA training by joining Chuck Liddell's SLO Kickboxing Academy. Shields fought five fights at 185 lbs "for fun, to stay in shape and learn some self defense".

In the summer of 2001, Shields received a wrestling scholarship to San Francisco State University. At that time he began training with the Cesar Gracie Fight Team, resulting in a dramatic improvement of the jiu jitsu variety. He is a three-time Grapplers Quest Advance Champion, Pan American Championships Jiu Jitsu Champion, Pan Am Open Advance Submission Champion, Gracie Open Superfight Champion and finished 3rd place at the ADCC Submission Wrestling World Championship in 2005. His victory at the Pan American Championships (which requires wearing a uniform) as a purple belt is notable because Jake Shields claims he has trained "about four hours with the gi in [his] life," and the Pan Americans is one of the largest Brazilian jiu-jitsu competitions in the world. He continued to improve on the kickboxing skills he picked up with Chuck Liddell, by cross-training with the professional Muay Thai kickboxing team at the Fairtex Combat Academy, training with Muay Thai Champions Jongsanan Fairtex and Alex Gong. He was awarded the rank of black belt in Brazilian jiu-jitsu by Cesar Gracie in February 2007.

Shields was the head instructor of BJJ (Brazilian jiu-jitsu) and MMA at the Fairtex-Gracie affiliate in San Francisco from March 2002 until April 2008.

Shields has developed a style of fighting called "American Jiu-Jitsu," which he has tattooed on his forearm. Shields's American Jiu-Jitsu is a no-gi style of grappling for MMA and self-defense is a complete combat art that combines the relaxed and ready position and submission techniques of Brazilian jiu-jitsu with the explosive takedowns, throws and transitions of wrestling.

Mixed martial arts
Shields is best known for his 15-fight winning streak, finishing eight of his eleven opponents before being defeated by UFC welterweight champion Georges St-Pierre in a hard-fought five round battle at UFC 129. Shields has captured the Shooto World Mixed Martial Arts Championship and the Rumble on the Rock World Championship. He submitted Nick Thompson via guillotine choke in a bout for the Elite XC Welterweight Championship.

Lawler took the center of the cage and looked comfortable on his feet. Robbie Lawler said in the post fight interview, "His striking was good. He threw a lot of kicks. He worked. He threw hands and wasn't shying away from standup, that's for sure." Two minutes into the first round, Shields pounced and secured a guillotine choke to finish his opponent via submission at 2:02 of the first round.

At Strikeforce: Fedor vs. Rogers he fought Jason 'Mayhem' Miller for the vacant Strikeforce Middleweight Championship after Cung Le stepped down as champion to pursue his acting career. Shields defeated Miller via unanimous decision (48–47, 49–46, and 49–46).

Shields successfully defended his title, defeating former Pride World Welterweight and Pride Middleweight Champion Dan Henderson via unanimous decision on April 17, 2010, at Strikeforce: Nashville.

Ultimate Fighting Championship
Shields was spotted and shown on camera next to UFC President Dana White at the WEC 48 PPV. With Dana White saying, "He's mine!" and his arm around Shields, this fueled rumors of Shields signing with the UFC. Jake Shields stated in an interview that it was tough for Strikeforce to provide him with exciting fights and this would be a key aspect in his decision to stay or leave. Dana White also stated in this interview he would be willing to pay huge sums to strip away one of Strikeforce's champions. This has further fueled speculation that Shields would leave Strikeforce for the UFC.

On June 30, Strikeforce released Shields from the organization during his contract renegotiation period. Shields then entered into talks with the UFC, with his manager and father, Jack Shields, stating that his son was eager to fight against top UFC fighters, such as Anderson Silva. In July 2010, it was reported that Shields was close to signing a deal with the Ultimate Fighting Championship to compete in the promotion's Welterweight division.

Shields made his UFC debut against Martin Kampmann on October 23, 2010, at UFC 121. Prior to Shields's UFC debut, Dana White stated that, if Shields defeated Martin Kampmann, he was most likely next in line for an opportunity to compete for the UFC Welterweight Championship. After Shields defeated Kampmann via split decision, White confirmed that Shields would receive a title shot against the winner of the Georges St-Pierre vs. Josh Koscheck fight at UFC 124.

Georges St-Pierre won his UFC 124 bout against Josh Koscheck. Shields fought St-Pierre for the UFC Welterweight Championship on April 30, 2011, at UFC 129 in Toronto. Shields lost via unanimous decision. This was Shields's first loss in over 6 years.

Shields faced Jake Ellenberger on September 17, 2011, at UFC Fight Night 25, losing via first-round TKO. This was the first time Shields has been finished in over ten years.

Shields faced Yoshihiro Akiyama on February 26, 2012, at UFC 144, winning via unanimous decision.

Shields returned to the middleweight division and faced Ed Herman on August 11, 2012, at UFC 150. He won the bout via unanimous decision. However, on October 12, 2012, it was announced that Jake Shields had failed his drug test at UFC 150 and he was subsequently fined and suspended.  The result of the fight was overturned to a No Contest. In January 2015 Shields said the failed test was due to a banned diuretic.

Shields faced Tyron Woodley in a welterweight bout on June 15, 2013, at UFC 161. The bout was contested on the feet for nearly its entirety in a largely uneventful fight where neither fighter was able to deliver any significant offense. Shields defeated Woodley via split decision.

Shields next faced Demian Maia on October 9, 2013, at UFC Fight Night 29. As expected, the contest between the two decorated jiu jitsu practitioners took place mostly on the ground, and Shields won via split decision.

Shields fought Héctor Lombard on March 15, 2014, at UFC 171. Shields lost the fight via unanimous decision.

On April 6, 2014, it was announced that Shields was released from the promotion.

After his release from the UFC, the outspoken and often candid president of the organization, Dana White, had this to say about Shields:

"We look at everything. Everything. Money has something to do with it. I'd be lying if I said it didn't. But that wasn't the only reason or the main reason. It was a part of the piece of the puzzle as we were doing our evaluation of him. Mixed martial arts is a young man's game. I like Jake Shields a lot. But let's be honest here: Where was he going in this [welterweight] division of animals we have? He's on the downswing, and he's never going to be the guy. His stand-up never improved. He hasn't really shown anything in his last couple of fights to make you go, 'Holy [expletive].' Right now, at this point, he's just another guy."

World Series of Fighting
In April 2014, Shields signed a multi-fight deal with the World Series of Fighting. Shields was expected to compete at WSOF 11 on July 5, 2014, against Jon Fitch. However, Shields was forced out of the bout due to a shoulder injury.

Shields made his debut for World Series of Fighting at WSOF 14 on October 11, 2014, in Edmonton, Alberta, Canada against WSOF Canadian Welterweight Champion Ryan Ford. He won the fight via submission in the first round.

In his second fight for the promotion, Shields faced Brian Foster in the main event at WSOF 17 on January 17, 2015. He again won the fight via submission in the first round.

Shields faced Rousimar Palhares on August 1, 2015, at WSOF 22. He lost the fight by submission due to a kimura, marking his first loss by submission. This wasn't without controversy as Palhares repeatedly eye gouged Shields after several warnings from the ref, Palhares also held onto the submission well after Shields had tapped. In response, Shields punched Palhares in the face after the fight was over, and attempted a kick which the referee blocked. Both Shields and Palhares were temporarily suspended by the NSAC after the fight.

Shields was lined up to face Jon Fitch for the vacant WSOF welterweight championship at WSOF 30 on April 1, 2016. Though they have never competed together in an MMA contest, Shields holds a victory over Fitch in a submission grappling match. However, the match was later canceled due to contract issues between Shields and the company.

On September 13, 2016, it was announced that Shields would challenge for the WSOF Welterweight Championship against Jon Fitch on November 12, 2016, at WSOF 34. On October 17, 2016, it was announced that the fight was then rescheduled to take place on December 31, 2016, in the co-main event. Shields lost the fight by unanimous decision.

Professional Fighters League 
Shields made his PFL debut at PFL Everett on July 29, 2017, against Danny Davis Jr. He won the bout via unanimous decision.

On July 5, 2018, Shields made his PFL season debut at PFL 3 losing to Ray Cooper III via technical knockout in the second round.

On August 16, 2018, Shields defeated Herman Terrado at PFL 6 via unanimous decision advancing to the playoffs.

On October 20, 2018, Shields faced Ray Cooper III in a rematch at PFL 10. He lost the fight via technical knockout in the first round to advance to the semifinals of the playoffs.

Grappling events
On November 22, 2014, Shields fought Roberto Satoshi in a grappling match in Metamoris V.  The fight ended in a draw.

On April 2, 2016, Shields then fought AJ Agazarm at Polaris 3. The match was controversial as it was plagued with eye gouges and strikes coming from both fighters. At one point in the match Shields slapped Agazarm while both men were standing. The fight ended in the draw.

Shields defeated Diego Sanchez in a grappling match at High Rollerz 4 on February 5, 2020.

Personal life
Shields has a daughter, born December 2000, and is a single father. He is a lifelong vegetarian. He appeared in both print and video ads for PETA, touting his vegetarian lifestyle.

On August 29, 2011, Shields's father and manager, Jack Shields, died at the age of 67. Jake is also a lifelong Liverpool F.C. supporter.

Controversies

Comments made towards Greta Thunberg

On December 28, 2022, following an online altercation between climate activist Greta Thunberg and men's rights activist and influencer Andrew Tate, Shields suggested that Tate should give Thunberg a 'proper smashing' so that she abandons her 'crazy feminest/climate [nonsense]'. Shields's comments were widely criticised as being derogatory and misogynistic.

Television and film
Jake Shields stars in and co-produced Fight Life, an award-winning documentary on the sport of MMA, the film is directed by James Z. Feng and released in 2013. Shields appeared in three episodes of Bully Beatdown on MTV and MTV2 on April 12, 2009, a different episode on September 10, and again in an MTV.com-exclusive episode. Shields also served as a grappling coach for Chuck Liddell on The Ultimate Fighter 11, and appeared on the Animal Planet channel for episodes of Wild Recon and Venom in Vegas.

Championships and accomplishments

Amateur wrestling
USA Wrestling
FILA Junior World Team Trials Qualifier
FILA University World Team Trials Qualifier
Amateur Athletic Union
Freestyle Wrestling National Championship runner-up
California Community College Athletic Association
All-American (1997, 1998)
All-State Selection (1997, 1998)
Western State Conference All First Team Selection (1997, 1998)
Collegiate career record: 56–14 (1997–1998)
California Interscholastic Federation
CIF State Championship Qualifier (1997)
Mother Lode League Champion (1997)
Calaveras High School Wrestling Wall of Fame (1996–1997)
Calaveras High School Record for Most Near Falls in a Season (74)
Scholastic career record: 108–45 (1993–1997)

Mixed martial arts
Strikeforce
Strikeforce Middleweight Championship (One time)
One successful title defense
Elite Xtreme Combat
EliteXC Welterweight Championship (One time; first; last)
One successful title defense
Professional Shooto Japan
Shooto Welterweight Championship (One time)
Rumble on the Rock
Rumble on the Rock Welterweight Championship
Rumble on the Rock Welterweight Tournament Winner

Submission grappling
Abu Dhabi Combat Club
2005 ADCC Submission Wrestling World Championships bronze medalist
Fight 2 Win
FTW Middleweight Championship (One time, current)
International Brazilian Jiu-Jitsu Federation
2005 Pan American Championships gold medalist
International Gracie Jiu-Jitsu Federation
2007 Gracie Open Superfight champion
Grapplers Quest
Grapplers Quest Advance champion (three times)
 Polaris Pro Grappling
 2016 Polaris 3
 2017 Polaris 5
 2018 Polaris 6

Mixed martial arts record

|- 
|Loss
|align=center| 33–11–1 (1)
|Ray Cooper III
|TKO (punches)
|PFL 10
|
|align=center|1
|align=center|3:10
|Washington, D.C., U.S.
|
|-
| Win
| align=center| 33–10–1 (1)
| Herman Terrado
| Decision (unanimous)
| PFL 6
| 
| align=center| 3
| align=center| 5:00
| Atlantic City, New Jersey, U.S.
| 
|- 
|Loss
|align=center| (1)
|Ray Cooper III
|TKO (punches)
|PFL 3
|
|align=center|2
|align=center|2:09
|Washington, D.C., U.S.
|
|- 
| Win
| align=center| 32–9–1 (1)
| Danny Davis Jr.
| Decision (unanimous)
| PFL: Everett
| 
| align=center| 3
| align=center| 5:00
| Everett, Washington, U.S.
| 
|- 
| Loss
| align=center| 31–9–1 (1)
| Jon Fitch
| Decision (unanimous)
| WSOF 34
| 
| align=center| 5
| align=center| 5:00
| New York City, U.S.
| 
|- 
| Loss
| align=center| 31–8–1 (1)
| Rousimar Palhares
| Submission (kimura)
| WSOF 22
| 
| align=center| 3
| align=center| 2:02
| Las Vegas, Nevada, U.S.
| 
|-
| Win
| align=center| 31–7–1 (1)
| Brian Foster
| Submission (neck crank)
| WSOF 17
| 
| align=center| 1
| align=center| 2:51
| Las Vegas, Nevada, U.S.
| 
|-
| Win
| align=center| 30–7–1 (1)
| Ryan Ford
| Submission (rear-naked choke)
| WSOF 14
| 
| align=center| 1
| align=center| 4:29
| Edmonton, Alberta, Canada
| 
|-
| Loss
| align=center| 29–7–1 (1)
| Héctor Lombard
| Decision (unanimous)
| UFC 171
| 
| align=center| 3
| align=center| 5:00
| Dallas, Texas, U.S.
| 
|-
| Win
| align=center| 29–6–1 (1)
| Demian Maia
| Decision (split)
| UFC Fight Night: Maia vs. Shields
| 
| align=center| 5
| align=center| 5:00
| Barueri, Brazil
| 
|-
| Win
| align=center| 28–6–1 (1)
| Tyron Woodley
| Decision (split)
| UFC 161
| 
| align=center| 3
| align=center| 5:00
| Winnipeg, Manitoba, Canada
| 
|-
| NC
| align=center| 27–6–1 (1)
| Ed Herman
| NC (overturned)
| UFC 150
| 
| align=center| 3
| align=center| 5:00
| Denver, Colorado, U.S.
| .
|-
| Win
| align=center| 27–6–1
| Yoshihiro Akiyama
| Decision (unanimous)
| UFC 144
| 
| align=center| 3
| align=center| 5:00
| Saitama, Japan
|
|-
| Loss
| align=center| 26–6–1
| Jake Ellenberger
| TKO (knee and punches)
| UFC Fight Night: Shields vs. Ellenberger
| 
| align=center| 1
| align=center| 0:53
| New Orleans, Louisiana, U.S.
| 
|-
| Loss
| align=center| 26–5–1
| Georges St-Pierre
| Decision (unanimous)
| UFC 129
| 
| align=center| 5
| align=center| 5:00
| Toronto, Ontario, Canada
| 
|-
| Win
| align=center| 26–4–1
| Martin Kampmann
| Decision (split)
| UFC 121
| 
| align=center| 3
| align=center| 5:00
| Anaheim, California, U.S.
| 
|-
| Win
| align=center| 25–4–1
| Dan Henderson
| Decision (unanimous)
| Strikeforce: Nashville
| 
| align=center| 5
| align=center| 5:00
| Nashville, Tennessee, U.S.
| 
|-
| Win
| align=center| 24–4–1
| Jason Miller
| Decision (unanimous)
| Strikeforce: Fedor vs. Rogers
| 
| align=center| 5
| align=center| 5:00
| Hoffman Estates, Illinois, U.S.
| 
|-
| Win
| align=center| 23–4–1
| Robbie Lawler
| Submission (guillotine choke)
| Strikeforce: Lawler vs. Shields
| 
| align=center| 1
| align=center| 2:02
| St. Louis, Missouri, U.S.
| 
|-
| Win
| align=center| 22–4–1
| Paul Daley
| Submission (armbar)
| EliteXC: Heat
| 
| align=center| 2
| align=center| 3:47
| Sunrise, Florida, U.S.
| 
|-
| Win
| align=center| 21–4–1
| Nick Thompson
| Submission (guillotine choke)
| EliteXC: Unfinished Business
| 
| align=center| 1
| align=center| 1:03
| Stockton, California, U.S.
| 
|-
| Win
| align=center| 20–4–1
| Mike Pyle
| Submission (rear-naked choke)
| EliteXC: Renegade
| 
| align=center| 1
| align=center| 3:39
| Corpus Christi, Texas, U.S.
| 
|-
| Win
| align=center| 19–4–1
| Renato Verissimo
| TKO (punches and elbows)
| EliteXC: Uprising
| 
| align=center| 1
| align=center| 4:00
| Honolulu, Hawaii, U.S.
| 
|-
| Win
| align=center| 18–4–1
| Ido Pariente
| Submission (rear-naked choke)
| Dynamite!! USA
| 
| align=center| 1
| align=center| 2:06
| Los Angeles, California, U.S.
| 
|-
| Win
| align=center| 17–4–1
| Ray Steinbeiss
| Submission (guillotine choke)
| Bodog Fight: Costa Rica Combat
| 
| align=center| 1
| align=center| 1:29
| San José, Costa Rica
| 
|-
| Win
| align=center| 16–4–1
| Steve Berger
| TKO (punches)
| FCP: Malice at Cow Palace
| 
| align=center| 2
| align=center| 1:36
| San Francisco, California, U.S.
| 
|-
| Win
| align=center| 15–4–1
| Carlos Condit
| Decision (unanimous)
| Rumble on the Rock 9
| 
| align=center| 3
| align=center| 5:00
| Honolulu, Hawaii, U.S.
|
|-
| Win
| align=center| 14–4–1
| Yushin Okami
| Decision (majority)
| Rumble on the Rock 9
| 
| align=center| 3
| align=center| 5:00
| Honolulu, Hawaii, U.S.
|
|-
| Win
| align=center| 13–4–1
| Dave Menne
| Decision (unanimous)
| Rumble on the Rock 8
| 
| align=center| 3
| align=center| 5:00
| Honolulu, Hawaii, U.S.
|
|-
| Win
| align=center| 12–4–1
| Toby Imada
| Decision (unanimous)
| Kage Kombat
| 
| align=center| 3
| align=center| 5:00
| California, U.S.
| 
|-
| Loss
| align=center| 11–4–1
| Akira Kikuchi
| Decision (unanimous)
| Shooto: Year End Show 2004
| 
| align=center| 3
| align=center| 5:00
| Tokyo, Japan
| 
|-
| Win
| align=center| 11–3–1
| Ray Cooper
| Submission (rear-naked choke)
| Shooto Hawaii: Soljah Fight Night
| 
| align=center| 1
| align=center| 3:29
| Honolulu, Hawaii, U.S.
| 
|-
| Draw
| align=center| 10–3–1
| Kazuo Misaki
| Draw
| Pancrase - Hybrid 10
| 
| align=center| 3
| align=center| 5:00
| Tokyo, Japan
| 
|-
| Win
| align=center| 10–3
| Akira Kikuchi
| Decision (unanimous)
| Shooto - 8/10 in Yokohama Cultural Gymnasium
| 
| align=center| 3
| align=center| 5:00
| Kanagawa, Japan
| 
|-
| Win
| align=center| 9–3
| Milton Vieira
| Decision (unanimous)
| Shooto: Midwest Fighting
| 
| align=center| 3
| align=center| 5:00
| Hammond, Indiana, U.S.
| 
|-
| Win
| align=center| 8–3
| Hayato Sakurai
| Decision (unanimous)
| Shooto: Year End Show 2002
| 
| align=center| 3
| align=center| 5:00
| Chiba, Chiba, Japan
| 
|-
| Loss
| align=center| 7–3
| Ray Cooper
| Decision (majority)
| Warriors Quest 6: Best of the Best
| 
| align=center| 3
| align=center| 5:00
| Honolulu, Hawaii, U.S.
| 
|-
| Win
| align=center| 7–2
| Robert Ferguson
| Decision (unanimous)
| GC 7: Casualties of War
| 
| align=center| 2
| align=center| 5:00
| Colusa, California, U.S.
|
|-
| Win
| align=center| 6–2
| Jeremy Jackson
| Submission (rear-naked choke)
| GC 6: Caged Beasts
| 
| align=center| 1
| align=center| 2:03
| Colusa, California, U.S.
| 
|-
| Win
| align=center| 5–2
| Tracy Hess
| Decision (unanimous)
| GC 3: Showdown at Soboba
| 
| align=center| 2
| align=center| 5:00
| Friant, California, U.S.
| 
|-
| Win
| align=center| 4–2
| Randy Velarde
| Submission (rear-naked choke)
| GC 2: Collision at Colusa
| 
| align=center| 2
| align=center| 3:19
| Colusa, California, U.S.
| 
|-
| Loss
| align=center| 3–2
| Phillip Miller
| Decision (unanimous)
| IFC: Warriors Challenge 9
| 
| align=center| 2
| align=center| 8:00
| Friant, California, U.S.
| 
|-
| Win
| align=center| 3–1
| Shannon Ritch
| Submission (arm-triangle choke)
| Best of the Best
| 
| align=center| 1
| align=center| 2:45
| Tempe, Arizona, U.S.
| 
|-
| Loss
| align=center| 2–1
| Marty Armendarez
| TKO (punches)
| IFC: Warriors Challenge 6
| 
| align=center| 1
| align=center| 7:34
| Friant, California, U.S.
| 
|-
| Win
| align=center| 2–0
| Brian Warren
| Decision (unanimous)
| CFF: The Cobra Challenge 1999
| 
| align=center| 1
| align=center| 10:00
| Anza, California, U.S.
| 
|-
| Win
| align=center| 1–0
| Paul Harrison
| TKO (punches)
| CFF: The Cobra Qualifier 1999
| 
| align=center| 1
| align=center| 3:22
| Anza, California, U.S.
|

Submission grappling record
{| class="wikitable sortable" style="font-size:80%; text-align:left;"
|-
| colspan=8 style="text-align:center;" | 32 Matches, 17 Wins (4 Submissions), 11 Losses (5 Submissions), 4 Draws
|-
!  Result
!  style="text-align:center;"| Rec.
!  Opponent
!  Method
!  Event
!  Division
!  Date
!  Location
|-
|Loss
|style="text-align:center;"|17–11–4
| Renato Canuto
| Submission (flying armbar)
|rowspan=3|Third Coast Grappling 8
|rowspan=3| -85 kg
|rowspan=3|October 23, 2021
|rowspan=3|Phoenix, Arizona, U.S.
|-
|Win
|style="text-align:center;"|17–10–4
| Patrick Downey
| Decision
|-
|Win
|style="text-align:center;"|16–10–4
| Eric Alequin
| Decision (tech fall)
|-
|Loss
|style="text-align:center;"|15–10–4
| Brent Primus
| Submission (armbar)
|Submission Underground 14
|Superfight
|May 31, 2020
| Portland, Oregon, U.S.
|-
|Loss
|style="text-align:center;"|15–9–4
| Richie Martinez
| Submission (armbar)
|Submission Underground 11
|Superfight
|February 23, 2020
| Portland, Oregon, U.S.
|-
|Loss
|style="text-align:center;"|15–8–4
| Gilbert Burns
| Decision
|rowspan=4|Quintet Ultra
|rowspan=4| Absolute
|rowspan=4|December 12, 2019 
|rowspan=4| Las Vegas, Nevada, U.S.
|-
|Draw
|style="text-align:center;"|15–7–4
| Glover Teixeira
|Draw
|-
|Win
|style="text-align:center;"|15–7–3
| Cub Swanson 
| Injury 
|-
|Win
|style="text-align:center;"|14–7–3
| Mark Muñoz 
| Submission (arm-triangle choke) 
|-
|Loss
|style="text-align:center;"|13–7–3
| Romulo Barral
| Referee decision
|Third Coast Grappling 3
|Superfight
|December 7, 2019
| Houston, Texas, U.S.
|-
|Win
|style="text-align:center;"|13–6–3
| Austin Vanderford
| Quickest Escape
|Submission Underground 8
|Superfight
|May 12, 2019
| Portland, Oregon, U.S.
|-
|Loss
|style="text-align:center;"|12–6–3
| Rafael Lovato Jr.
| Decision (unanimous)
|Polaris 9
|Superfight
|March 15, 2019
| London, England
|-
|Win
|style="text-align:center;"|12–5–3
| Ron Keslar
| Decision (unanimous)
|Fight 2 Win 98
|Superfight - Won FTW Middleweight Championship
|January 19, 2019
| San Jose, California, U.S.
|-
|Loss
|style="text-align:center;"|11–5–3
| Craig Jones
| Submission (heel hook)
|Polaris 6
|Superfight
|February 17, 2018
| London, England
|-
|Win
|style="text-align:center;"|11–4–3
| Kit Dale
| Referee Decision
|Fight to Win Pro 26
|Superfight
|February 10, 2018
| Denver, Colorado, U.S.
|-
|Win
|style="text-align:center;"|10–4–3
| Gilbert Burns
| Quickest Escape
|Submission Underground 6
|Superfight
|December 3, 2017
| Portland, Oregon, U.S.
|-
|Win
|style="text-align:center;"|9–4–3
| Murilo Santana
| Referee Decision
|Fight to Win Pro 51
|Superfight
|October 21, 2017
| Brooklyn, New York City, U.S.
|-
|Loss
|style="text-align:center;"|8–4–3
| Abdurakhman Bilarov
|Points
| ADCC World Championship
| –79 kg
|September 23, 2017
| Espoo, Finland
|-
|Win
|style="text-align:center;"|8–3–3
| Dan Strauss
| Decision (unanimous)
|Polaris 5
|Superfight
|August 19, 2017
| London, England
|-
|Win
|style="text-align:center;"|7–3–3
| Dillon Danis
| Quickest Escape 
|Submission Underground 4
|Superfight
|May 14, 2017
| Portland, Oregon, U.S.
|-
|Win
|style="text-align:center;"|6–3–3
| Lyoto Machida
| Submission (heel hook)
|Fight to Win Pro
|Superfight
|August 13, 2016
| Denver, Colorado, U.S.
|-
|Win
|style="text-align:center;"|5–3–3
| Chris Lytle
| Quickest Escape
|Submission Underground
|Superfight
|July 17, 2016
| Portland, Oregon, U.S.
|-
|Draw
|style="text-align:center;"|4–3–3
| AJ Agazarm
| Draw
|Polaris 3
|Superfight
|April 2, 2016
| Poole, England
|-
|Draw
|style="text-align:center;"|4–3–2
| Roberto de Souza
| Draw
|Metamoris 5
|Superfight
|November 22, 2014
| Los Angeles, California, U.S.
|-
|Draw
|style="text-align:center;"|4–2–1
| Leandro Lo
| Draw
|World Jiu-Jitsu Expo
|Superfight
|November 10, 2013
| Long Beach, California, U.S.
|-
|Loss
|style="text-align:center;"|4–3
| Marcelo Garcia
| Submission (guillotine choke)
|PSL X-Mission
| Superfight
| November 17, 2006
| Los Angeles, California, U.S.
|-
|Loss
|style="text-align:center;"|4–2
| Saulo Ribeiro
| Points
|LA Sub X
|Superfight
| May 26, 2006
| Los Angeles, California, U.S.
|-
|Win
|style="text-align:center;"|4–1
| Jon Fitch
| Submission (rear-naked choke)
|Gracie Open
|Superfight
|2005
| San Francisco, California, U.S.
|-
|Win
|style="text-align:center;"|3–1
| Leonardo Santos
| Submission (rear-naked choke)
|rowspan=4|ADCC World Championship 
|rowspan=4| –77 kg
|rowspan=4|May 28, 2005
|rowspan=4| Los Angeles, California, U.S.
|-
|Loss
|style="text-align:center;"|2–1
| Pablo Popovitch
| Points
|-
|Win
|style="text-align:center;"|2–0
| Cameron Earle
| Points
|-
|Win
|style="text-align:center;"|1–0
| Diego Sanchez
| Points
|-

See also
List of male mixed martial artists

References

External links

 
 UFC Profile
 Gracie Fighter Profile
 Jake Shields BJJ Heroes

1979 births
Living people
American male mixed martial artists
Mixed martial artists from California
Mixed martial artists from Tennessee
American male sport wrestlers
Amateur wrestlers
American practitioners of Brazilian jiu-jitsu
People awarded a black belt in Brazilian jiu-jitsu
American sportspeople in doping cases
Doping cases in mixed martial arts
Welterweight mixed martial artists
Middleweight mixed martial artists
Mixed martial artists utilizing collegiate wrestling
Mixed martial artists utilizing Brazilian jiu-jitsu
Mixed martial artists utilizing shootfighting
Strikeforce (mixed martial arts) champions
Ultimate Fighting Championship male fighters
Submission grapplers
Sportspeople from San Francisco
People from Calaveras County, California
Cuesta College alumni
San Francisco State University alumni
People from Summertown, Tennessee